The Fund for Constitutional Government (FCG) is an American nonprofit organization. Founded in 1974, its stated mission is to "awaken the American public's concern about the Constitution and to stimulate interest in monitoring how government conducts its business." The organization was founded by Stewart Rawlings Mott, an heir to the General Motors fortune.

References

Whistleblower support organizations
Civil rights organizations in the United States
Transparency (behavior)
Stewart Rawlings Mott